The Electrochemical equivalent, sometimes abbreviated Eq or Z, of a chemical element is the mass of that element (in grams) transported by 1 coulomb of electric charge. The electrochemical equivalent of an element is measured with a voltameter.

Definition 
The electrochemical equivalent of a substance is the mass of the substance deposited to one of the electrodes when a current of 1 ampere is passed for 1 second, i.e. a quantity of electricity of one coulomb is passed.

The formula for finding electrochemical equivalent is as follows:

Eq values of some elements in kg/C

References

Physical chemistry
Units of chemical measurement